Slavcho Vasev Velev was a Bulgarian writer and politician who was a member of the Bulgarian Communist Party.

Biography 
He was born on June 19, 1906 in the Pernik village of Zablyano. In 1932 he graduated in philosophy from Sofia University. In the same year, together with other like-minded people, he founded the Union of Labor Writers. In the period 1936 to 1944 he was deputy editor-in-chief of the Zarya newspaper. He became a member of the Bulgarian Communist Party in 1944. After the September 9 coup, he was vice-chairman of the Committee on Science, Arts and Culture . Between 1948 and 1953 he was a press attaché at the Bulgarian Embassy in Moscow. He was the Editor-in-Chief of the Literary Front From 1959 to 1964 he was chairman of the Union of Bulgarian Journalists. For two years between 1964 and 1966 he was director of the Ivan Vazov National Theater. In the period 1966 to 1971 he was a member of the Central Committee of the Bulgarian Communist Party. He was awarded the Order of Georgi Dimitrov. He died on August 16, 1990.

Bibliography 
Ours in Moscow, Ed. Bulgarian writer, 1966
Hristo Hrolev-Grafa. Biographical Essay, Ed. of the Bulgarian Communist Party, 1966
In the minutes before twelve: Selected works, Ed. Bulgarian writer, 1976
10 of the year, Ed. People's Youth, 1980
Pages for Dimitrov, Ed. of the Bulgarian Agrarian Union, 1984
The Red Stork, Ed. Bulgarian writer, 1986
Battle for a new world. Notes of the journalist, memoirs and journalism, Ed. Bulgarian writer, 1986

References 

1906 births
1990 deaths
20th-century Bulgarian writers
20th-century Bulgarian politicians
Bulgarian Communist Party politicians
Sofia University alumni
Recipients of the Order of Georgi Dimitrov
Bulgarian editors
Bulgarian theatre directors